Andy Pratt is the second studio album by American singer-songwriter Andy Pratt, released in 1973 by Columbia Records. It was Pratt's first album of entirely new music since his debut Records Are Like Life in 1969.
 
On release, Pratt received a positive critical reception, but had only modest commercial success. The only single issued from Andy Pratt: "Avenging Annie" was also a moderate success, peaking at number 78 in the US.

Critical reception
In 1973,  the album was ranked No. 3 on Dutch Muziekkrant OOR's list of best albums of 1973. And Al Kooper listed the album at No. 58 on his list of 100 Greatest Recordings of All Time.

The album has consistently been praised by critics. Reviewing the album in his consumer guide for The Village Voice, Robert Christgau gave the album a C and highly praised the track "Avenging Annie" commenting that it "is an astounding tale of feminist revenge in the twilight of the counterculture." but didn't comment on any of the other tracks off the album.

In a retrospective review for AllMusic, critic Michael Ofjord gave the album four and a half out of five stars and wrote that "Andy Pratt's self-titled album is a very quirky, idiosyncratic album that definitely establishes Pratt as a major force in the singer-songwriter arena." while also praising "Avenging Annie" commenting that "The fast piano technique is impressive, as are some other production touches (such as the cat sounds and descending guitar line). The song deserves its classic status hands down."

Track listing

Personnel
Credits are adapted from the album's liner notes.
Andy Pratt – lead and background vocals; guitars; bass guitars; piano; accordion; sitar; tabla; clavinet
John Nagy – guitars; mandolin; mandola; mandocello
Gary Anderson – flute; baritone and tenor saxophones
Anastasios Karatza – electric guitars, hi-hat
Jim Thompson – electric guitars
Jesse Henderson – drums
Abraham Laboriel – bass guitars
Bill Elliot – organ
Nick Koumoutseas – backing vocals

Additional musicians
Roger Hock – trombone
Bob McCarthy – acoustic guitar on "Call Up That Old Friend"
John Payne – clarinet
Juma Santos – congas
Rick Shlosser – bongos

Chart performance

Peak position

Covers
 The song "Avenging Annie" was covered by The Who's lead vocalist Roger Daltrey, for his third solo album One of the Boys. Daltrey also released his version of the track as a single 1977. Notably, his version changed the lyrics from 1st person to 3rd.

References
Citations

External links

Andy Pratt (singer-songwriter) albums
1973 albums
Columbia Records albums